A Kung Ngam is a village and an area in northeast Shau Kei Wan in the northeast of Hong Kong Island, in Hong Kong. It contains a fish terminal market, several temples and the Hong Kong Museum of Coastal Defence.

Name
A Kung literally means maternal grandfather or old man in Cantonese while Ngam means rock, but in the case of this place name, "A Kung" refers to Tam Kung, a sea deity who the quarry workers believed in. A temple dedicated to Tam Kung is located in A Kung Ngam.

History
A Kung Ngam was a rock quarry in the 19th century, and the area was predominantly inhabited by quarry workers who immigrated from Huizhou and Chaozhou.

At the time of the 1911 census, the population of A Kung Ngam was 269. The number of males was 161.

A fire broke out in the early morning of 31 October 2005. Some ten houses in the village were burnt.

A Kung Ngam Shipyards 
A Kung Ngam Shipyards was a port for export of stone materials in the mid 18th century. As there were so many ships, it became a typhoon shelter and shipyards were built. At the end of the 20th century, land reclamation from the sea caused fishing boats to anchor elsewhere. Nowadays, the number of shipyards has decreased due to a decrease in number of ships going there.

Buildings
Temples in A Kung Ngam include:
 Tam Kung Sin Shing Temple (譚公仙聖廟)
 Yuk Wong Temple
 Fook Tak Temple
 A Kung Ngam Lighthouse

Education
A Kung Ngam is in Primary One Admission (POA) School Net 16. Within the school net are multiple aided schools (operated independently but funded with government money) and two government schools: Shau Kei Wan Government Primary School and Aldrich Bay Government Primary School.

See also
 List of places in Hong Kong

References

External links

 Maps and weather information for A Kung Ngam

 
Eastern District, Hong Kong